This article contains the filmography of Hong Kong actor Sammo Hung.

Films

Dragon Laws television films

Television series

Documentaries

References

Male actor filmographies
Hong Kong filmographies